The Priaulx League  is the senior football league on the island of Guernsey, and is run by the Guernsey Football League Management LBG, (prior to 2016 the Guernsey Football Association). Although the league is affiliated with the English FA, it does not form a part of the English football league system. The winners of the Priaulx League go on to play the champions of the Jersey Combination for the Upton Park Trophy.

History 
The competition was first held in 1893; it is named in honour of O. Priaulx of Bury St. Edmunds, who donated £5 to purchase a trophy.

There are two other league competitions on the island (the Jackson League and Veterans League), but there is no promotion or relegation into or from these leagues.

In 2010 the league representative side (then called then Guernsey County League) defeated the Liverpool County Premier League 5–2 in the final of the FA National League System Cup and went on to represent England in the UEFA Regions Cup, being eliminated in the group stage in Macedonia.

Teams

The league lined up with the following teams for the 2022–23 season.

 Alderney
 Belgrave Wanderers
 Guernsey Rangers
 Guernsey Rovers
 Northerners
 St. Martins AC
 Sylvans
 Vale Recreation

Winners
Past winners of the league are:

Winners Tally 
Up to and including 2021-22 Season:

References

External links
 Results Website

Football leagues in Guernsey
Sports leagues established in 1893
1893 establishments in Guernsey